Sinoenergy Corporation is a manufacturer of compressed natural gas (CNG), vehicle and gas station equipment as well as an operator of CNG stations in China. The company also manufactures a wide variety of pressure containers used in the petroleum and chemical, metallurgy, electricity generation and food and brewery industries. Sinoenergy was founded in July 2004 and is based in Qingdao, Shandong, China.

References
 https://web.archive.org/web/20080726173527/http://www.emerging-china.com/articles/366169.html

External links

 Official website

Manufacturing companies based in Qingdao
Manufacturing companies established in 2004
Natural gas companies of China
Retail companies established in 2004